Taillecavat is a commune located in the Gironde department and Nouvelle-Aquitaine region in southwestern France.

The name of the commune in occitan is Talhacavat.

Geography 

Taillecavat is located at one hour by car of Bordeaux and Agen. Fifteen minutes are needed to go to the city of Marmande (more than 30,000 people urban area).

Taillecavat is neighboring of Lot-et-Garonne department, so it presents the advantage of an opening on both departments and the entertainment they offer.

Population

See also
Communes of the Gironde department

References

Communes of Gironde